The A18 class (also called the A19 class) is a series of 6 container ships originally built for the United Arab Shipping Company (UASC) and now operated by Hapag-Lloyd. The ships have a maximum theoretical capacity of 19,870 TEU. The ships were built by Hyundai Heavy Industries in South Korea.

List of ships

See also 
 A15-class container ship
 A13-class container ship

References 

Container ship classes
Ships built by Hyundai Heavy Industries Group